The Imperieuse-class cruiser was a class of two armoured cruisers launched between 1883 and 1884 for the Royal Navy.

Description

In an 1886 magazine article, Sir Edward Reed complained that these ships did not deserve to be called "armoured", as they were not armoured at bow or stern, only along the middle  of each side. As completed, the two ships were overweight, with the result that the belt was completely submerged, leaving them armoured in name only.

The layout of the main armament was unusual for the time, having one gun each forward and aft, and another gun mounted on either beam – in a lozenge arrangement similar to that employed by the French.  The original secondary battery comprised ten 6-inch (152mm) guns, but the overweight condition of these ships forced the elimination of four of these weapons.

Intended for prolonged deployments on distant foreign stations, the ships were sheathed with wood and copper to prevent marine growth on the hull, and were originally fitted with a brig sailing rig to economize on coal.  After trials showed them to be sluggish under sail, the masts and yards were removed and replaced by a single pole mast between the funnels.  This reduction in rig and the weight saved thereby allowed the reinstallation of two 6-inch guns, for a total of eight.

Ships

 – launched in 1883, converted to a depot ship in 1905 and renamed Sapphire II, later reverted to Imperieuse in 1909, and sold in 1913.
 – launched in 1884, scrapped 1906.  One of Warspites 9.2-inch breech-blocks is/was held at the Royal Military College of Science (RMCS) at Shrivenham.

Building Programme

The following table gives the build details and purchase cost of the members of the Imperieuse class.  Standard British practice at that time was for these costs to exclude armament and stores.  In the table:
Machinery meant "propelling machinery".
Hull included "hydraulic machinery, gun mountings, etc."

Notes

References
 Brassey, T.A. (ed) The Naval Annual 1895
 Brassey, T.A. (ed) The Naval Annual 1903

External links

Cruiser classes
 
Ship classes of the Royal Navy